The Nykvåg/Nykan Nature Reserve is located in the municipality of Bø in Nordland county, Norway.

The nature reserve lies between Sandvika and Nykvåg, south of the Nyke/Tussen and Frugga nature reserves. The land area includes the west side of Langøya and three larger islands (Fuglenyken, Måsnyken, and Spjøten) as well as several smaller islands. The area is protected to safeguard many important breeding sites for seabirds. The nature reserve was established on December 6, 2002. Norwegian County Road 916 passes by a bird cliff on the northeast edge of the reserve. It has been designated an Important Bird Area (IBA) by BirdLife International (BLI) because it supports breeding populations of great cormorants, Atlantic puffins and razorbills.

References

External links
 Nykvåg/Nykan, Nyke/Tussen og Frugga. Map and description of the nature reserve.
 Lofoten og Vesterålen jordskifterett. 2006. Grensekart over Nykvåg/Nykan naturreservat i Bø kommune. 1:6,000 map of the nature reserve.

Nature reserves in Norway
Protected areas of Nordland
Important Bird Areas of Norway
Important Bird Areas of Arctic islands
Seabird colonies
Bø, Nordland
Protected areas established in 2002